Feyenoord Vrouwen is a Dutch football club from Rotterdam representing Feyenoord in the Vrouwen Eredivisie, the professional women's league in the Netherlands. The team was founded in March 2021 with the team entering the league from the 2021–22 season.

Current squad

Backroom staff

Record and statistics

Seasons

Records
 Biggest win: 4–1 (v Ajax – Eredivisie, 3 October 2021)
 Biggest defeat: 0–6 (v Twente – Eredivisie, 13 March 2022)
 Most goals scored in a single season: 7 by Romeé van de Lavoir (2021–22)
 Most league goals scored in a single season: 6 by Romeé van de Lavoir and Maxime Bennink (2021–22)

References

External links
Official site

Feyenoord
Football clubs in Rotterdam
Women's football clubs in the Netherlands
Eredivisie (women) teams
2021 establishments in the Netherlands
Association football clubs established in 2021